Qarasaqqal or Karasakkal or Garasaggal may refer to:

Qarasaqqal, Kurdamir
Qarasaqqal, Lachin